Yurye of Silla (r. 284–298, died 298), also known as Yuri or by his official title Yurye Isageum, was the fourteenth ruler of the Korean state of Silla.  He was a Seok and the son of King Jobun, but his mother was a Park and a descendant of Bak Hyeokgeose.

The Samguk Sagi relates that Yurye's mother conceived from starlight.  It also records repeated invasions from Wa during his reign, and relatively cordial relations with Baekje.

Family 

 Grandfather: Seok Goljeong (석골정)
 Grandmother: Queen Ongmo, of the Park clan (옥모부인 김씨), Gudo Galmunwang (구도 갈문왕)
 Father: Jobun of Silla
 Mother:  Queen Park, of the Park clan (미소부인 박씨), daughter of Naehae of Silla

See also
Three Kingdoms of Korea
Rulers of Korea
History of Korea

References
 Kim Bu-sik. Samguk Sagi, Book 2.

Silla rulers
298 deaths
3rd-century monarchs in Asia
3rd-century Korean people